This is a list of German women's football transfers in the summer transfer window 2015 by club. Frauen Bundesliga clubs are listed according to the 2014-15 season table.

Bundesliga

In
 As of 23 October 2015. Source: Framba

1 On loan

Out
 As of 11 October 2015. Source: Framba
 Includes players that have played at least one game in the Bundesliga, or in the 2. Bundesliga if the team is just promoted. Source: Soccerway 

 1 On loan
 2 Back from loan

External links
 DFB official Frauen Bundesliga website

Football transfers summer 2015
Trans
2015
2015–16 in German women's football
Football